Silene acutifolia is a species of herb native to northwest Spain as well as central and northern Portugal. The species is polycarpic and usually grows in rocky environments.

Description
The flowers are purplish-pink and hypogynous. They are also hermaphroditic and protandrous, however, the temporal separation between the male or female stages is incomplete making self-pollination possible. One study from 2002 suggested this might indicate that the species emerged recently in the genus.

References

acutifolia
Flora of Portugal
Flora of Spain
Plants described in 1869